The Resurrection of Christ Cathedral of Korçë is the main Albanian Orthodox church in Korçë, Albania. The cathedral was built by the Albanian Orthodox Church in 1995. A previous cathedral in Korçë named after St. George was destroyed by the Communist authorities in 1968. It received the money for construction from Greeks and also from Orthodox members of the Albanian diaspora.

It is painted in pink, blue and brown. Inside, the modest white interior is dominated by a huge carved wooden iconostasis.

References 

Buildings and structures in Korçë
Cathedrals in Albania
Churches in Korçë County
Tourist attractions in Korçë
Albanian Orthodox cathedrals
Churches completed in 1992